Ledell is a given name. Notable people with the name include:

Ledell Eackles (born 1966), American basketball player
Ledell Lee (1965–2017), American convicted murderer
Ledell Titcomb (1866–1950), American baseball player

See also
Liddell

Masculine given names